The Bement-Billings House is a historic house located on NY 38 north of Newark Valley in Tioga County, New York.

Description and history 
It is a -story, clapboard farmhouse on a random ashlar stone foundation, exhibiting characteristic features of the Federal and Greek Revival styles. The house began as a one-room cabin, built about 1796, and evolved during the 19th century into the extensive 15-room,  structure that exists today. The house underwent extensive renovation in 1977. Also on the property is a contributing privy.

The house was listed on the National Register of Historic Places on February 19, 1990.

The house is now the centerpiece of the Bement-Billings Farmstead Museum and is owned and operated by the Newark Valley Historical Society. The museum includes the mid-19th century period house, a reconstructed blacksmith shop, a threshing barn, wood shop, carriage shed, and welcome center. Open seasonally on weekends, tours and craft demonstrations are provided by costumed docents.

References

External links
 Bement-Billings Farmstead Museum - Newark Valley Historical Society

Houses on the National Register of Historic Places in New York (state)
Federal architecture in New York (state)
Houses completed in 1796
Houses in Tioga County, New York
Museums in Tioga County, New York
Historic house museums in New York (state)
National Register of Historic Places in Tioga County, New York
1796 establishments in New York (state)